Rosalinda or Roselinda is a female given name of Old German origin, and is also thought to be a name of Spanish origin. It is also a combination of the name Linda and Rosa, the Spanish form of Rose. With Linda meaning beautiful in Spanish and Rosa meaning rose, the name might just mean Beautiful Rose.

People with the given name Rosalinda include:

 Rosalinda Asuncion Vicente (born 1943), Associate Justice of the Philippine Court of Appeals
 Rosalinda Celentano (born 1968), Italian actress
 Rosalinda Galli (born 1949), Italian voice actress
 Roselinda Soipan Tuiya, Kenyan politician
 Rosalinda González Valencia, Mexican businesswoman and suspected money launderer

See also
 Rosalinda (disambiguation)

Feminine given names
Given names derived from plants or flowers